This is a list of public art in the London Borough of Sutton.

Beddington

Belmont

Carshalton

Cheam

Sutton

Wallington

References

External links
 
 

Buildings and structures in the London Borough of Sutton
Sutton
Public art